James Haywood Cumberbatch (9 February 1909 – first ¼ 1972) was an English professional rugby league footballer who played in the 1930s.

Background
James Cumberbatch was born in Liverpool,  Lancashire, and his death aged  was registered in Northumberland South district.

International honours
Cumberbatch won caps for England while at Broughton Rangers in 1937 against France, and while at Newcastle in 1938 against Wales, and was the only player to win an England cap while at the now defunct Newcastle rugby league club.

Contemporaneous article extract
"This live piece of mercury, who has come before the selectors as a Tour probable, first came to Manchester to play for Swinton, who passed him over. However, he signed for Broughton and has since proved their finest acquisition. His clever play on the Broughton left wing has also proved him to be one of the League’s foremost attackers. Born in Liverpool, he first played the Association game for his school until he became attached to Barrow St. Matthew’s Club. Has earned his County Cap, and has also played for the League against France. Jimmy’s brother is a member of the Barrow Club, and two brothers keep up the family tradition of excelling at sport. Jimmy is a good sport, a good player, and one of the League’s most popular players."

Genealogical information
Cumberbatch was the son of Theodore Theophilus Cumberbatch (1863/4 – 1931 ), a ship's steward, originally from Barbados, and Mary Ellen née Kewin originally from Ramsey, Isle of Man (Marriage third ¼ 1889 in Fylde district ). The marriage of Cumberbatch and Eva (née Ball) was registered during first ¼ 1936 in Manchester South district, the birth of their son, also named James, was registered during third ¼ 1937 in Manchester North district. Cumberbatch was the brother of the rugby league footballer Val Cumberbatch.

References

External links
Parkinson, Kate (25 June 2007). "Bringing Broughton Rangers back", Greater Manchester Online. Retrieved 6 August 2022.
Jimmy Cumberbatch at cumberbatch.org

1909 births
1972 deaths
Black British sportsmen
Broughton Rangers players
England national rugby league team players
English people of Barbadian descent
English people of Manx descent
English rugby league players
Lancashire rugby league team players
Newcastle RLFC players
Rugby league players from Liverpool
Rugby league wingers